Dowanhill is an affluent area in the West End of Glasgow, Scotland.

An upper middle-class residential district, the area generally contains a mixture of terraced townhouses with private communal gardens, detached villas with private grounds and a number of four-storey tenement buildings. Originally constructed from the middle of the 19th century onwards a few of the buildings have now had their original interiors reconstructed to convert them into multiple dwelling houses, this type of redevelopment continues to the present day.

Dowanhill's postcode district, G12, is the most expensive in Glasgow, beating the average property price of second place, G3, by more than £100,000 as of 2022. 

In common with many areas of the West End, continual development causes concern for many residents who fear the area becoming overdeveloped; this concern was highlighted in the bitter dispute over the proposed redevelopment of Dowanhill Tennis Club.

In 2005–2006 due to increased traffic levels and to discourage rat running Glasgow City Council introduced traffic calming measures and converted a number of streets into one-way traffic systems.

In 1869 Jefferson Davis, the only president of the Confederate States of America, stayed in Dowanhill while visiting the Glasgow merchant James Smith.

The earliest known registered scout troop in the world, the 1st Glasgow Scout Troop, is still active in Dowanhill. Captain 'Boss' Young established the troop in 1907 and the group was registered with Scout HQ, London on 16 January 1908.

35 Saltoun Street, the building depicted in the 1993 painting Windows in the West, is located in Dowanhill.

References

Areas of Glasgow
Partick